PAC International, LLC. manufactures a complete line of acoustical noise control products for use in residential (single-family housing and multiple-family housing) and commercial building construction.

The company introduced the first rubber isolator, the RSIC-1 (Resilient Sound Isolation Clip) product in 2000. Resilient Sound Isolation Clips are manufactured in the United States and sold throughout the Americas. RSIC-1 was engineered to provide noise control and be both cost effective and environmentally friendly.

PAC International's noise control products help buildings exceed the International Building Code requirements for both fire and sound. The RSIC-1 product is the only noise control product classified by Underwriters Laboratories (UL) for both fire and sound; and the PAC Line of Products is UL Classified for use in over 189 fire resistive design assemblies.

RSIC family of products 
RSIC and RSIC-1 are registered trademarks of PAC International, Inc. RSIC has become the brand name for a family of Resilient Sound Isolation Clip products that are used extensively in residential and commercial building construction.

 RSIC-1
 RSIC-SIX (Spring Isolator X)
 RC-1 Boost
 RSIC-HWI (Hanger Wall Isolator)
 RSIC-SI-1 Ultra (Spring Isolator)
 RSIC-SI-CRC (Spring Isolator for Cold Rolled Channel)
 RSIC-SI-WHI (Spring Isolator/Wire Hanger Isolator)
 RSIC-SI-FF Series (Full Frame Spring Isolators)
 RSIC-1 EXT04 
 RSIC-1.5 CRC (Cold Rolled Channel)
 RSIC-1 LP (Low Profile)
 RSIC-1-Edge
 RSIC-1 TTC (Tube Truss Connector)
 RSIC-1 Retro
 RSIC-1 Backer
 RSIC-1 Backer HD
 RSIC-1 ADM (Adjustable Direct Mount)
 RSIC-1 ADM Mini Drop
 RSIC-1 ADM Wood
 RSIC-U
 RISC-U-HD
 RSIC-AMI (Acoustic Mullion Isolator)
 RSIC-WFI (Wall Frame Isolator)
 RSIC-FGP (Fiberglass Pad)
 RSIC-DC04
 RSIC-DC04 HD
 RSIC-DC04 X2
 RSIC-DC04 X2 HD/DD
 RSIC-V
 RSIC-FCR-HD (Furring Channel Retainer)
 RSIC-2
 RSIC-2 RETRO
 RSIC-CWB (Chase Wall Brace)
 RSIC-CWB HD/DD (Heavy Duty/Double Deflection)
 RSIC-CWB HD/DD DC (Heavy Duty/Double Deflection/Deflection Control)
 RSIC Joist Isolator
 RSIC-GDS Kits
 RSIC-FS (Flat Screen Television Isolation Mount)
 RSIC-PT (Perimeter Tape)
 RSIC Putty Pads
 RSIC Multi Clip 
 RSIC Leveling Clip

History 
PAC International, Inc. is a privately held corporation that began over 20 years ago. The company is now headquartered in Oregon.

PAC International is a company that strives to “give back” to society by exemplifying social responsibility practices, including manufacturing products in the United States and having RSIC-1 products assembled within the local community. Product assembly is performed by adults with intellectual disabilities working through Opportunity Village, a non-profit community rehabilitation organization.

Management 
Carmen Gernhart, President & AP/AR Coordinator
Elzo Gernhart, President & Research and Development
Mike Gernhart, Vice President & Research and Development
Michael Raley, Acoustical Engineer & Research and Development
Taylor Gernhart, Marketing Director & Coordinator
Kelly Gernhart, Accounting Director & Coordinator
Alisha Meyers, Customer Relations & Sales Manager
Dalton Gernhart, Warehouse Production & Management
Alyssa Gernhart, Analyst & Marketing Assistant

Notes

External links 
 PAC International, LLC.
 PAC International, LLC. - New Site

Manufacturing companies based in Oregon
American companies established in 1993
1993 establishments in Oregon
Companies based in Clackamas County, Oregon